Giulio Cesare Sacchetti (1586 – 28 June 1663) was an Italian Catholic Cardinal and was twice included in the French Court's list of acceptable candidates for the Papacy, in 1644 and 1655.

Early life

Sacchetti was born in 1586, the second surviving son of Giovanni Battista Sacchetti and Francesca Altoviti, both Florentine patricians who had moved to Rome in the late sixteenth century.  Giulio was the uncle of Cardinal Urbano Sacchetti.

Sacchetti's father was a trading partner of the Barberini family of Pope Urban VIII and the two families became close. Sacchetti's elder brother, Marcello Sacchetti, became papal treasurer to Pope Urban VIII and a prominent patron of the arts until his death in 1629.

Sacchetti was educated at the University of Perugia and the University of Pisa. On 10 December 1623, he was consecrated bishop by Agustín Spínola Basadone, Bishop of Tortosa, with Ottavio Accoramboni, Archbishop Emeritus of Urbino, and Diego Merino, Bishop of Montepeloso, serving as co-consecrators, and elected Bishop of Gravina.

Elevation to cardinal

Sacchetti was papal nuncio to Madrid from 1624 to 1626.  His service in the Spanish Nunciature and ties to the new pope ensured his becoming a cardinal only two years after his consecration.  He was elevated to the cardinalate by Pope Urban VIII on 19 January 1626, and named Cardinal-Priest of Santa Susanna. He was appointed papal legate to Ferrara from 1627 to 1631, and to Bologna from 1637 until 1640.

He held a number of senior positions within the Roman Curia, including Prefect of the Sacred Congregation of Religious Immunity, the Sacred Congregation of Rites and the Tribunal of the Apostolic Signature of Justice. From 1641 to 1642 he served a term as Camerlengo of the Sacred College of Cardinals.

In 1652 he was appointed Cardinal Bishop of Frascati, a position he held until 1655 when he was appointed Cardinal Bishop of Sabina.

He was appointed to the special council assembled to fight the plague in the papal states and was Prefect of the Tridentine Council from 1661 until his death.

Papal conclaves

Sacchetti was presented by Antonio Barberini, at the instruction of Cardinal Mazarin, the French first minister, as the French nomination for the papacy at the papal conclave of 1644. So certain of victory was Sacchetti's brother Matteo, that he threw open the doors of his cellar and began giving away wine in celebration shouting, "Viva Papa Sacchetti!" (Long live Pope Sacchetti!). Contemporary John Bargrave suggested Matteo's certainty stemmed from the fact that the Barberini (two of whom were cardinals and nephews of the previous Pope Urban VIII) had started referring to him as Your Eminence; a title reserved for cardinals, suggesting his brother's elevation to the papacy (and thus his own to the cardinalate) was imminent.

However, Sacchetti was not a popular choice with the people of Rome who were afraid he would pursue Barberini policies and practices if elected. To this end they devised a rhyming ditty expressing: 'Don't make Sacchetti pope or Rome will fall to pieces'. Spain, fearing he would be pro-French, vetoed his nomination via its representative Cardinal Gil de Albornoz. The conclave instead elected Giovanni Battista Pamphili, who took the papal throne as Pope Innocent X. Mazarin attempted to use the French veto against Pamphili, who apparently favoured the Spanish, but it arrived too late.

Despite his close association with the Barberini, who suffered under Innocent X, Giulio Sacchetti's career continued to flourish.

When Innocent X died, Sacchetti was again presented as the French candidate at the papal conclave of 1655 but when it became apparent that he did not have a majority, he asked Mazarin to give his support to Fabio Chigi, who was duly elected and took the name of Alexander VII.

Death and burial
Sacchetti died 28 June 1663 in Rome and was buried at the Florentine church of San Giovanni dei Fiorentini in Rome.

Episcopal succession

References

1586 births
1663 deaths
17th-century Italian cardinals
Cardinals created by Pope Urban VIII